The 2000 Finnish Figure Skating Championships took place between January 15 and 16, 2000 in Tampere. Skaters competed in the disciplines of men's singles and women's singles. The event was used to help determine the Finnish team to the 2000 European Championships.

Senior results

Men

Ladies

Finnish Figure Skating Championships, 2000
Finnish Figure Skating Championships
2000 in Finnish sport